The Saint Afram Syriac Orthodox Cathedral is a Syriac Orthodox cathedral in Södertälje in Sweden. It was opened in 1983, and is governed by the Syriac Orthodox Patriarchate's Representation in Sweden. "It was not until 1983 that Syriacs constructed their first large-scale, purpose-built church in Södertälje. While they could use Swedish churches, their liturgical needs and social practices were not readily adaptable to these, nor were existing structures able to accommodate the hundreds of Syriac congregants who wanted to attend services. The first Syriac-commissioned church, St. Afrem’s, designed by a Swedish architect, was given a discreet exterior that concealed a decorative interior—primarily the product of donated Syriac labor and craftsmanship."

References

External links

Cathedrals in Sweden
Churches completed in 1983
Södertälje
Churches in Stockholm County
Syriac Orthodox cathedrals
Oriental Orthodoxy in Sweden